The Children's Study Home started in 1865 in as Springfield Home for Friendless Women and Children, Inc.  Springfield, Massachusetts was the first charitable institution in Western Mass.  At that time, the Study Home addressed women's issues, family welfare, emotional rehabilitation and child development.  Its first President was Rachel Capen Merriam.  The home responded to problems facing women and children at the end of the American Civil War era.

On April 27, 1865, the home received its incorporation from the Commonwealth of Massachusetts.  A “well built and commodious house” on Union Street was purchased.  According to Article 2 of the 1865 Constitution, the “object of this institution shall be to provide a temporary home for friendless and destitute women and children; and to give them employment and instruction with the ultimate design of providing for them a more permanent situation, or fitting them to maintain themselves.”  At the end of its first year in March 1866, forty women and twenty children had received services from the Home for Friendless Women and Children.

In 1866, the Massachusetts Legislature was asked to allocate $2,000 to the organization which was granted with the provision that the community in Springfield provide a match of funds through private donations.  The community raised $2,123.91 along with more tangible donations such as flour and clothes.  The home came to be known as Springfield's first public charity.

Throughout the 19th century the home continued to serve women and children enduring some type of difficulty due to the war, immigration, physical abuse, sexual abuse, imprisonment, illness, drug addiction, and/or unmarried and pregnant.

In 1870, after outgrowing the Union Street home, and after the donations of many, a new additional facility was constructed on Buckingham Street, a Children's Home, and its grand opening was in May 1871.  The first school was established in 1873. The Union Street home then had the space needed for females.

Around 1872 Rachel Capen Merriam transferred leadership to a new President, Mrs. William Rice.

During the following decades and into the new century, the troubles of society commanded growth of facilities and growth of donations.  In 1897, a home on Williams Street opened, a Home for Women, and an addition to the Buckingham Street home was added.  By 1926 the structure on Buckingham Street was demolished due to structural condition.  The Sherman Street address was added in November 1928 at St. Peter's Rectory.  The Williams Street facility became known as the only home for unwed mothers in the city.  At this point, the managerial structure of the corporation had been divided into three divisions with Mrs. Edward Bradford chairing the William Street committee; Mrs. Frederick Everett chairing the Buckingham Street committee; and Mrs. Robert Cooley chairing the newly created Sherman St. Committee.

The cottage was opened in 1935.   Eventually a third building was added to Sherman Street to house administration, laundry and staff.

Due to findings of the Council of Social Agencies, the Home for Unmarried mothers was closed forever in 1938.  The corporation would now focus exclusively on children's needs.  The Home at this time was providing temporary care for youngsters facing some type of disruption in their family life.  In 1940, the United Fund and the Community Council asked the Home to consider a different program for emotionally disturbed boys and girls up to age 12.  This was accepted and that work began.  At this time, the agency became known as The Children's Study Home to reflect the diagnostic and treatment work we pioneered for children with emotional and behavioral problems.

By 1959, it became necessary to address the Home's mission and future direction due to decline in admissions.  The board voted in 1961 to accept recommendations for a treatment oriented institution for emotionally disturbed boys and girls ages 6 to 12.  In addition, the recommendation called for a foster home program followed by a group home arrangement for children ready to re-enter the community.

On February 28, 1966, the Kathleen Thornton School, named after the director of the agency from 1940–1960 opened as a school to educate youngsters not able to function in public school.

The agency was again expanded in 1976 to include treatment of teenagers facing emotional challenges.  By 1979 a campus in the Sixteen Acres section of Springfield was acquired to meet the special needs of this program.  The Mill Pond School, houses a middle school for grades 6–8 and a high school, grades 9–12 and today, still includes academic, administrative and recreational components, and in 2001 added SHARP 1, an adolescent residential program.

The Children's Study Home began providing services for Cape Cod and the Islands in 1993 with a focus on adolescent and family services and today has expanded to provide additional services for youth and families.

The Children's Study Home Inc. today lives through its mission of being a charitable organization devoted to identifying and solving child and family problems for the community.

External links 
www.studyhome.org

References 

Gagnon, Frances (1990)125 Years The Children's Study Home, Founded as The Springfield Home For Friendless Women & Children

Non-profit organizations based in Massachusetts
Organizations established in 1865
1865 establishments in Massachusetts
Organizations based in Springfield, Massachusetts